Robert Hennet (22 January 1886 – 1930) was a Belgian fencer. He won a gold medal in the team épée event at the 1912 Summer Olympics.

References

1886 births
1930 deaths
Belgian male fencers
Belgian épée fencers
Olympic fencers of Belgium
Fencers at the 1912 Summer Olympics
Fencers at the 1920 Summer Olympics
Olympic gold medalists for Belgium
Olympic medalists in fencing
Medalists at the 1912 Summer Olympics
20th-century Belgian people